"Undress to the Beat" is a dance-pop song performed by German recording Jeanette. The song was written by Johan Bobäck, Christian Fast, Marica Lindé and Mans Ek and produced by Bobäck for Jeanette's seventh album Undress to the Beat (2009). It was released as a single on 27 February 2009 in Germany and saw Jeanette return to the German Top 10 Singles Chart after 5 years.

Formats and track listings
These are the formats and track listings of major single releases of "Undress to the Beat".

CD single
(0602517949188; Released )
"Undress to the Beat" (Single version) – 3:47
"Undress to the Beat" (Eddie Thoneick remix) – 6:08

12-inch single
(0602517946644; Released )
"Undress to the Beat" (Eddie Thoneick remix) – 6:08
"Undress to the Beat" (Eddie Thoneick dub remix) – 5:29
"Undress to the Beat" (Alex Os'kin & Michael Haase remix) – 8:47
"Undress to the Beat" (Olli Collins & Fred remix) – 7:19

Digital download #1
(Released )
"Undress to the Beat" (Single version) – 3:47
"Undress to the Beat" (Radio version) – 3:38
"Undress to the Beat" (Eddie Thoneick remix) – 6:01
"Undress to the Beat" (Banks & Rodriquez remix) – 4:05

Digital download #2
(Released )
"Undress to the Beat" (Single version) – 3:47
"Undress to the Beat" (Radio version) – 3:38
"Undress to the Beat" (Eddie Thoneick remix) – 6:01

Chart performance
"Undress to the Beat" debuted on the German singles chart at number six on 16 March 2009. In Austria, the track debuted at number twenty. "Undress to the Beat" reached number twenty-four on the Eurochart Hot 100 Singles chart on 21 March 2009.

Weekly charts

Personnel
The following people contributed to "Undress to the Beat":

Jeanette - vocals
Johan Bobäck - production, programming, mixing
Frank Kretschmer - vocal recording 
RuDee - editing, mastering

References

External links
Official website

2009 singles
Jeanette Biedermann songs
Songs written by Johan Bobäck
2009 songs
Universal Music Group singles